Edgar Quinteros (born 19 July 1940) is a Bolivian footballer. He played in five matches for the Bolivia national football team from 1963 to 1967. He was also part of Bolivia's squad that won the 1963 South American Championship.

References

1940 births
Living people
Bolivian footballers
Bolivia international footballers
Place of birth missing (living people)
Association football forwards
Club Aurora players
Club San José players
Club Bolívar players